Rwakitura is the personal country home of the president of Uganda, Yoweri Kaguta Museveni. Apart from being his personal home, it is also the site of selected official meetings with Ugandan and foreign visitors. The late John Garang, former Vice President of Sudan, had just left Rwakitura on his way back to Sudan when the helicopter he was traveling in crashed in the hills of Southern Sudan.

Populated places in Uganda